Henry Franklin Severens (May 11, 1835 – June 8, 1923) was a United States circuit judge of the United States Court of Appeals for the Sixth Circuit and the United States Circuit Courts for the Sixth Circuit and previously was a United States district judge of the United States District Court for the Western District of Michigan.

Education and career
Born in Rockingham, Vermont, Severens received an Artium Baccalaureus degree from Middlebury College in 1857 and read law to enter the bar in 1859. He was in private practice in Three Rivers, Michigan from 1860 to 1861. A Democrat in politics, he was prosecuting attorney of St. Joseph County from 1861 to 1864, returning to private practice in Kalamazoo, Michigan from 1865 to 1886. During that time, he was also land developer in Allegan County, Michigan.

Federal judicial service
President Grover Cleveland nominated Severens on May 14, 1886, to a seat on the United States District Court for the Western District of Michigan that Judge Solomon Lewis Withey vacated. The United States Senate confirmed him on May 25, 1886, and he received his commission the same day. His service terminated on March 16, 1900, due to his elevation to the Sixth Circuit.

President William McKinley nominated Severens on February 6, 1900, to a joint seat on the United States Court of Appeals for the Sixth Circuit and the United States Circuit Courts for the Sixth Circuit that Judge William Howard Taft vacated. The Senate confirmed him on February 20, 1900, and received his commission the same day. His service terminated on October 3, 1911, due to his resignation.

Death

Severens died on June 8, 1923, in Kalamazoo.

References

Sources
 

|-

1835 births
1923 deaths
Judges of the United States District Court for the Western District of Michigan
Judges of the United States Court of Appeals for the Sixth Circuit
United States federal judges appointed by Grover Cleveland
19th-century American judges
United States federal judges appointed by William McKinley
People from Rockingham, Vermont
United States federal judges admitted to the practice of law by reading law
People from St. Joseph County, Michigan
People from Kalamazoo, Michigan